Catherine Anne Cesnik  (born November 17, 1942; disappeared November 7, 1969) was an American Catholic religious sister who taught English and drama at Archbishop Keough High School in Baltimore, Maryland. On November 7, 1969, Cesnik disappeared. Her body was discovered on January 3, 1970, near a garbage dump in the Baltimore suburb of Lansdowne. Her unsolved murder served as the basis for the Netflix documentary series The Keepers in 2017.

Biography 
Catherine Anne Cesnik was born on November 17, 1942, in the Lawrenceville neighborhood of Pittsburgh, Pennsylvania. She was the eldest child of Joseph and Anna Omulac Cesnik. Her paternal grandparents, John (Jan) and Johanna Tomec Česnik, were Slovenians who emigrated from Yugoslavia, while her maternal grandfather, Joseph Omulac, came from Yugoslavia and maternal grandmother, Martha Hudok, came from Austria. Cesnik had three siblings.

Cesnik attended St. Mary's School on 57th Street and St. Augustine High School, both in Lawrenceville. She was valedictorian at the graduation of her high school class in 1960, after being the May Queen and the president of the senior class and the student council.

She joined the School Sisters of Notre Dame when she was 18.

Disappearance and death 
In the fall of 1969, Cesnik was teaching drama and English at Archbishop Keough High School in Baltimore, Maryland, a private, Catholic school for girls opened in 1965. On November 7, 1969, she left the apartment she shared with Helen Russell Phillips at the Carriage House Apartments, at 131 North Bend Road in Catonsville, en route to the Edmondson Village Shopping Center to purchase a gift for her sister's engagement at Hecht's jewelry store. She cashed a paycheck at First National Bank in Catonsville that night. She may have made a purchase at Muhly's Bakery in Edmondson Village, since a box of buns from that bakery was found in the front seat of her car. At 4:40am the next morning, Russell's friends, Peter McKeon and Gerard J. Koob, both Catholic priests, found Cesnik's car, in muddy condition, and illegally parked across from her apartment complex. Residents at the apartment complex noticed Cesnik in her car at approximately 8:30 that night, and others spotted her car illegally parked across the street about two hours later.

Search and discovery of body
Immediately after Cesnik's disappearance, police searched the area for her body without success. On January 3, 1970, her body was found by a hunter and his son in an informal landfill located on the 2100 block of Monumental Road, in a remote area of Lansdowne.

Background
In 2017, CBS Baltimore reported allegations from three women that during Cesnik's tenure at Archbishop Keough High School, two of the priests, Joseph Maskell and E. Neil Magnus, were sexually abusing the girls at the school in addition to trafficking them to others.

In 1995, Teresa Lancaster and Jean Wehner (née Hargadon), former students at Keough who say they were sexually abused by Maskell, filed a lawsuit against him, the school, gynecologist Christian Richter, the School Sisters of Notre Dame, the Archdiocese of Baltimore, and William H. Keeler. The trial court dismissed the action as time-barred by the statute of limitations. The plaintiffs appealed. A writ of certiorari was granted by the Maryland Court of Appeals, which upheld the lower court decision, ruling in part, "...that the mental process of repression of memories of past sexual abuse does not activate the discovery rule. The plaintiffs suits are thus barred by the statute of limitation."

Wehner said that Cesnik once came to her and asked, "Are the priests hurting you?" Both women have said that she was the only member of the school's staff who helped them and other girls abused by Maskell, et al., and they believe she was murdered prior to discussing the matter with the archdiocese of Baltimore. The Baltimore Sun reported in late 2016 that since 2011 the archdiocese has paid out settlements to Maskell's alleged victims.

Wehner further alleges that, two months before Cesnik's body was discovered, and only a day or two after Cesnik disappeared on November 1969, Maskell drove her to a wooded site near Fort Meade and showed her the body. Wehner says she remembers trying repeatedly to brush off the maggots crawling on Cesnik's face while repeating, "Help me, help me," and that Maskell told her, "You see what happens when you say bad things about people?" Her account was brought into question by scientific evidence showing that it would have been impossible for maggots to be alive at that time of year. 

Several days later, on November 13, 1969, the body of Joyce Malecki, a 20-year-old woman who looked like Wehner, was discovered by two hunters in the same wooded location where Maskell had driven Wehner. Cesnik's body was not found until January 3, 1970, and its discovery by two hunters was not in the wooded location near Fort Meade, but on the open hill trash dump of a small business property in Lansdowne.

In 2016, the Baltimore County Police Department (BCPD) reassigned the case, prompting new interviews and further investigation into the alleged sexual abuse at Keough. After obtaining permission from the state's attorney's office, the BCPD exhumed the body of Maskell, who died of a major stroke in 2001, but did not find a DNA match to evidence from the crime scene. Police spokeswoman Elise Armacost announced that this discovery does not exclude Maskell from being a suspect in the case.

In popular culture
Netflix produced a seven-part documentary series about the case called The Keepers, which debuted on May 19, 2017. The series features interviews with women who were Cesnik's students, with some who say they were sexually abused by Maskell and others.

See also
Crime in Baltimore
List of solved missing person cases
List of unsolved murders

References

1960s in Baltimore
1960s missing person cases
1969 murders in the United States
Crimes in Baltimore
Deaths by beating in the United States
Deaths by person in Maryland
Female murder victims
Formerly missing people
Incidents of violence against women
Missing person cases in Maryland
Murder in Maryland
November 1969 events in the United States
Roman Catholic Archdiocese of Baltimore
Unsolved murders in the United States
Violence against women in the United States
Catholic Church sexual abuse scandals